Zelig Shtorch (born 9 May 1946) is an Israeli former sports shooter. He competed at the 1968 Summer Olympics and the 1972 Summer Olympics. He also competed at the 1970 and 1974 Asian Games.

References

1946 births
Living people
Israeli male sport shooters
Olympic shooters of Israel
Shooters at the 1968 Summer Olympics
Shooters at the 1972 Summer Olympics
Sportspeople from Karaganda
Asian Games medalists in shooting
Shooters at the 1970 Asian Games
Shooters at the 1974 Asian Games
Asian Games gold medalists for Israel
Asian Games silver medalists for Israel
Medalists at the 1970 Asian Games